Masera is a comune (municipality) in the Province of Verbano-Cusio-Ossola in the Italian region Piedmont, located about  northeast of Turin and about  northwest of Verbania.

Masera borders the following municipalities: Crevoladossola, Domodossola, Druogno, Montecrestese, Santa Maria Maggiore, Trontano.

Demographic evolution

References

Masera